Kazimierz Brandys (27 October 1916 – 11 March 2000) was a Polish essayist and writer of film scripts.

Biography
Brandys was born in Łódź. He was the brother of the writer Marian Brandys and husband of the translator . He graduated in law from the University of Warsaw. He was first published in 1935 as a theatre critic, in the literary monthly  (Anvil of Youth). Between 1945 and 1950 he was a member of the editorial board of the weekly  (The Smithy).

In 1946 he joined the Polish Workers' Party. His literary career took off with the publication of his account of the two Warsaw uprisings during World War II.
From 1956 onwards he was the spokesman for the Polish communist party's programme of "renewal" and "moral cleansing". Between 1956 and 1960 he was on the editorial board of the weekly  (New Culture).

In 1966 he left the communist party as a protest against the political persecution of Leszek Kołakowski. In 1970 and 1971 he taught Slavonics at the Sorbonne. In 1976 he signed the Letter of 59, protesting against changes to the constitution of the People's Republic of Poland. After 1981 he lived outside of Poland. He died in 2000, in Paris.

Selected bibliography 

Drewniany koń (The Wooden horse), Warsaw: Czytelnik, 1946. 
 Między wojnami (Between the Wars): 
Samson, Warsaw: Czytelnik, 1948. 
Antygona (Antigone), Warsaw: Czytelnik, 1948. 
Troja, miasto otwarte (Troy: open city), Warsaw: Czytelnik, 1949. 
Człowiek nie umiera (Man does not die), Warsaw: Czytelnik, 1951. 
Obywatele (Citizens), Warsaw: Czytelnik, 1954. 
Matka Królów (Mother of Kings), Warsaw: Czytelnik, 1957. 
Romantyczność (Romance), stories, Warsaw: Czytelnik, 1960. 
Sposób bycia (Ways of being), Warsaw: Czytelnik, 1963. 
Jak być kochaną i inne opowiadania (How to be Loved and Other Stories), Warsaw: Czytelnik, 1970. 
Wariacje pocztowe (Postal variations), Warsaw: Czytelnik, 1972. 
Pomysł (An Idea), Warsaw: PIW, 1974. 
Nierzeczywistość (Unreality), Warsaw: NOWA, 1977. 
Rondo', Warsaw: Czytelnik, 1982.

Memoirs, journals, essaysMiesiące (Months), Warsaw-Paris: Instytut Literacki, 1978–1987. Sztuka konwersacji (The Art of conversation), London: Aneks, 1990. Charaktery i pisma (Characters and scripts), London: Aneks, 1991. Zapamiętane (Remembered), Cracow: WL, 1995. Przygody Robinsona'' (Robinson's adventures), Warsaw: Iskry, 1999.

References

External links 
 Kazimierz Brandys at culture.pl

1916 births
Polish male writers
University of Warsaw alumni
Academic staff of the University of Paris
Polish emigrants to France
Writers from Łódź
2000 deaths
Recipients of the State Award Badge (Poland)